The George W. Childs Recreation Site is a former Pennsylvania state park that is the site of a number of cascade waterfalls along Dingmans Creek; it has been part of the Delaware Water Gap National Recreation Area since 1983. It is located in Dingmans Ferry in Delaware Township, Pike County, Pennsylvania and is named for the late newspaper publisher George William Childs, whose widow deeded the land to the Commonwealth of Pennsylvania in 1912.   The site contains three main waterfalls: Factory Falls, Fulmer Falls and Deer Leap Falls and is a few miles upstream from Dingmans Falls and Silverthread Falls.

The pools below the waterfalls were once a popular spot for swimming during its ownership by the Pennsylvania Bureau of State Parks.  However, that activity had been banned upon transfer of ownership to the National Park Service.

The mill
The site is also host to the ruins of Joseph Brooks' 19th century woolen mill. About 1826 Joseph Brooks, a Welshman who had immigrated to Philadelphia, built a woolen mill of stone, 3½ stories high. He employed about 80 workers.

His sheep, though, were devoured by wolves or died from eating poisonous Sheep Laurel. Supplies, operatives, and materials such as expensive raw wool, had to be brought in from Philadelphia, and the finished products shipped down to this city by wagons, a trip which took 10 days.  Brooks died in 1832 and the mill was abandoned; the ruins are still visible.

References

Pocono Mountains
Protected areas of Pike County, Pennsylvania
Delaware Water Gap National Recreation Area